Elmworth is a hamlet in northern Alberta, Canada within the County of Grande Prairie No. 1. It is located on Highway 722 north of the Wapiti River and east of the British Columbia border. The Elmworth natural gas field stretches west and south of the hamlet.

The hamlet is located in census division No. 19 and in the federal riding of Peace River. The hamlet of Elmworth formed around Elmworth School District 3791, established in March 1919 and named after Elmworth, New Brunswick, home of settler Franklin Brewer. Classes began in a borrowed log cabin until the school could be built on the SE quarter of section 16, township 70, range 11, west of the 6th meridian. On 1 December 1920 a post office was opened in the Brewer home, and in 1927, the Brewers decided to add a country store to their services. They built a new home, store and post office across from the school on the NW quarter of section 9. The store also contained the government telephone. These two buildings formed the nucleus of the hamlet of Elmworth until the Elmworth Hall was added in 1947, a Community Church in 1948, and the Elmworth Cemetery soon after.

Climate

Demographics 
Elmworth recorded a population of 8 in the 1981 Census of Population conducted by Statistics Canada.

Amenities 
The hamlet is served by a school, the Elmworth School, administered by the Peace Wapiti School Division. The K-9 school has about 80 students.

A curling club was established in the community in 1963 and is still operational, offering two ice sheets and a yearly bonspiel. A rural store serves the hamlet and nearby settlements and farms. A church serving different denominations is now closed.

The Elmworth gas plant is operated by ConocoPhillips Canada immediately south of the settlement. It was opened in 1979 by Canadian Hunter Exploration.

See also 
List of communities in Alberta
List of hamlets in Alberta

References 

County of Grande Prairie No. 1
Hamlets in Alberta